Operation Faust may refer to:

a humanitarian mission, along with Operations Manna and Chowhound, to get food to starving Dutch civilians at the end of World War II
an early name of Operation Ranger, an American nuclear bomb test series